The South Dakota Democratic Party is the affiliate of the Democratic Party in the U.S. state of South Dakota.

History
1914 was a milestone for the Democrats when they won South Dakota's first U.S. Senate election by popular vote with their first statewide elected official, Edwin S. Johnson. This was their first success since William Jennings Bryan successfully campaigned (a novelty at the time) for the state's electoral votes in 1896 with help from an agrarian crisis. Nevertheless, it was not until the sweeping elections of 1932 that the Democratic Party took firm control as the party of the New Deal. With supermajorities in the state legislature and control of the governorship, the Democrats were able to set about securing newly available federal aid, replacing property tax with income and sales taxes, and instituting unemployment insurance.

While Democrats managed only one solid two-year election cycle in the 40s and 50s, a young two-term House member and Kennedy administration veteran with a strong understanding of agricultural policy, George McGovern, changed the party's fortunes when he squeaked out a win against incumbent Joe Foss in 1962's Senate election. An ardent opponent of the Vietnam War, McGovern's popularity and profile were on an upward trajectory that would only be shadowed by his presidential run in 1972. Despite his landslide loss to Republican incumbent Richard Nixon, he continued to serve in the U.S. Senate for nine more years as his party came to power at the state level.

Forty years after the New Dealers had brokered a tenuous, short-lived agreement with the farmers and workers of South Dakota and ninety years after The Boy Orator of the Platte wooed voters on his "Whirlwind through the Midwest", the Democrats were back. This time, they rode two decades of failed farm politics and favorite son McGovern's election bid to a slim one seat majority in the Senate, even slimmer tie breaking control in the House and a re-election win by Governor Richard F. Kneip. An electronic voterbase and superior get-out-the-vote operation helped many overcome long-time Republican incumbents who had become lethargic campaigners.

At about the same time in 1968, South Dakota Democrats gained a relatively small but increasingly active voting group when the Indian Civil Rights Act was passed. Since then, the state has created house districts 28A (in 1996) and 26A (in 2012) as majority-minority districts.

Since their heyday in the seventies, South Dakota Democrats have since seen their influence decline in the state. Currently, 31% of South Dakota voters are registered as Democrats compared to 46% registered as Republicans, putting the party at a disadvantage in the state.

Current elected leaders
The South Dakota Democratic Party does not hold any of the statewide offices and is a minority in both the South Dakota Senate and the South Dakota House of Representatives. Democrats do not have any members in the state's U.S congressional delegation.

State
Three seats in the State Senate and eight seats in the State House

Federal
None

Legislative leaders 
 Senate Minority Leader: Troy Heinert
 Assistant Senate Minority Leader: Craig Kennedy 
 Senate Minority Whip: Reynold Nesiba
 House Minority Leader: Jamie Smith 
 Assistant House Minority Leader: Steven McCleerey
 House Minority Whips: Erin Healy and Oren Lesmeister

References

External links
South Dakota Democratic Party

 
Democratic Party (United States) by state
Democratic Party